Edward Rutherfurd is a pen name for Francis Edward Wintle (born in 1948). He is best known as a writer of epic historical novels that span long periods of history but are set in particular places. His debut novel, Sarum, set the pattern for his work with a ten-thousand-year storyline.

Biography
Rutherfurd attended the University of Cambridge and Stanford Business School, where he earned a Sloan fellowship. After graduating he worked in political research, bookselling and publishing. He abandoned his career in the book trade in 1983 and returned to his childhood home to write Sarum, a historical novel with a ten-thousand year story, set in the area around the ancient monument of Stonehenge and Salisbury.

Sarum was published in 1987 and became an instant international best-seller, remaining for 23 weeks on the New York Times Bestseller List. Since then he produced seven more New York Times best-sellers: Russka, a novel of Russia; London; The Forest, set in England's New Forest which lies close by Sarum; two novels, Dublin: Foundation (The Princes of Ireland) and Ireland: Awakening (The Rebels of Ireland), which cover the story of Ireland from the time just before Saint Patrick to the twentieth century;  New York; Paris; and China.

His books have sold more than fifteen million copies and been translated into twenty languages. Rutherfurd settled near Dublin, Ireland in the early 1990s, but currently divides his time between Europe and North America.

New York: The Novel, won the Langum Prize for American Historical Fiction in 2009 and was awarded the Washington Irving Medal for Literary Excellence, by the Saint Nicholas Society of the City of New York, in 2011.

In 2015 Edward Rutherfurd was the recipient of the City of Zaragoza's International Historical Novel Honor Award "for his body of work in the field of the historical novel."

Style
Rutherfurd invents four to six fictional families and tells the stories of their descendants. Using this framework, he chronicles the history of a place, often from the beginning of civilisation to modern times – a kind of historical fiction inspired by the work of James Michener.

Rutherfurd's novels are generally at least 500 pages in length and sometimes more than 1,000. Divided into a number of parts, each chapter represents a different era in the place where the novel is set. There is usually an extensive family tree in the introduction, with each generational line matching the corresponding chapters.

Works

Sarum (1987) latterly titled Sarum: the Novel of England
Russka (1991) sometimes titled Russka: the Novel of Russia
London (1997)
The Forest (2000)
Dublin: Foundation (2004) titled The Princes of Ireland: The Dublin Saga in North America
Ireland: Awakening (2006) titled The Rebels of Ireland: The Dublin Saga in North America
New York (September 2009)
Paris (April 2013) sometimes titled Paris: A Novel
China (May 2021)

References

External links
 , interview, ContraCostaTimes.com 9 May 2004
 Edward Rutherfurd's Official site
 Edward Rutherfurd's Official Facebook Page

1948 births
20th-century British male writers
20th-century British novelists
21st-century British male writers
21st-century British novelists
British male novelists
Living people
People from Salisbury
Writers of historical fiction set in antiquity
Writers of historical fiction set in the modern age
Writers of historical fiction set in the Middle Ages